The Khorasani style (IPA: //) is an architectural style defined by Mohammad Karim Pirnia when categorizing Iranian architecture development in history. It is the first style of architecture appearing after the Muslim conquest of Persia, but is highly influenced by pre-Islamic designs. Landmarks of this style appear in the late 7th century, and span through the end of the 10th century CE.
 
Examples of this style are Mosque of Nain, Tarikhaneh-i Damghan, and Jame mosque of Isfahan

Gallery

See also
List of architectural styles

References

External links
Encyclopedia Iranica on ancient Iranian architecture
Stucco decorations in Iranian architecture

Architecture in Iran